Charles Ware may refer to:
 Charles Pickard Ware (1849–1921), American educator and folk music transcriber
 Charles R. Ware (1911–1942), United States Navy officer, killed in the Battle of Midway
 Charlie Ware (Baker County, Georgia) (1914–1999), figure whose case was a major point in the civil rights movement
 Charles Eliot Ware (1814–1887), Boston physician in Boston
 USS Charles R. Ware (DD-865), a Gearing-class destroyer of the United States Navy in service from 1945 to 1974.